Bertante is a surname. Notable people with the surname include:

Gabriela Bertante (born 1989), Brazilian model
Glelberson Luís Leopoldino Bertante (born 1986), Brazilian footballer